Stanley Aronowitz (January 6, 1933 – August 16, 2021) was a professor of sociology, cultural studies, and urban education at the CUNY Graduate Center. He was also a veteran political activist and cultural critic, an advocate for organized labor and a member of the interim consultative committee of the International Organization for a Participatory Society. In 2012, Aronowitz was awarded the Center for Study of Working Class Life's Lifetime Achievement Award at Stony Brook University.

Biography

Born on January 6, 1933, and raised in New York City, Aronowitz attended public primary school in The Bronx before enrolling in The High School of Music & Art in Manhattan. He then attended Brooklyn College until being suspended by its administration for engaging in a demonstration. Instead of returning to school the next year, Aronowitz moved to New Jersey, where he worked at several metalworking factories.

Aronowitz became involved in the American labor movement in New Jersey, and in 1959, while laid off from his job as a metalworker, he found work with the New Jersey Industrial Union Council. Collaborating with the council's president, Aronowitz cowrote New Jersey's unemployment compensation law, subsequently enacted by the state legislature in 1961.

His work with the Industrial Union Council led to Aronowitz's appointment as director of the organizing and boycott department of the Amalgamated Clothing Workers of America. Aronowitz spent four years traveling throughout the United States to develop the union's campaigns.

In the 1960s, while employed with the Clothing Workers, Aronowitz began participating in the Civil Rights Movement. He engaged in lunch counter sit-ins and gave speeches on the labor movement's behalf to the Student Non-Violent Coordinating Committee on the confluence of African-American civil rights and economic issues.

Through his work in civil rights, Aronowitz secured the role of labor coordinator, appointed by Bayard Rustin, on the planning committee of the March on Washington for Jobs and Freedom in 1962–3. Aronowitz was tasked with soliciting the support of American labor unions for the march, and while encountering resistance from the majority of trade unions, most notably the AFL–CIO, he secured the endorsement of the United Auto Workers, United Packinghouse Workers of America, as well as rubber and clothing workers' unions.

Aronowitz died on August 16, 2021, from complications of a stroke, in Manhattan.

Writings
Aronowitz was the author of numerous books on class, culture, sociology of science, and politics. With Fredric Jameson and John Brenkman, he was a founding editor of Duke University's Social Text, a journal that is subtitled "Theory, Culture, Ideology". He defended the journal from criticism after it published a hoax article in its summer 1996 issue (see Sokal Affair).

In that article, he stated that with this publication, "Our objective was to interrogate Marxists' habitual separation of political economy and culture and to make a contribution to their articulation, even reunification." Aronowitz, however, was not a working editor at the time of the Sokal scandal and had not seen the paper before publication. In an interview in the Brooklyn Rail after the publication of Taking it Big: C. Wright Mills and the Making of Political Intellectuals, he cited Mills's influence on his beliefs when he states, "My own insights, as a result of my own experience as a worker, as a trade unionist, and as an activist, were stimulated and, to some extent, guided by Mills’s example. His three major books on American social structure—The New Men of Power, White Collar, and The Power Elite—together constitute a compelling intellectual program for our own times."

Green politics

His campaign finished in 5th place, receiving 41,797 votes (.89%). He was also an active trade unionist and a member of the executive council of his university's union, the Professional Staff Congress. Aronowitz was a proponent of a reduced work week, among other strategies for improving everyday life, and worked actively with the Basic Income Earth Network toward the furtherance of such goals.

Other activities
In 1965 Aronowitz was one of the lecturers at the Free University of New York shortly after it was founded.

In 1976, Aronowitz (then living in San Diego and teaching at UC-Irvine, joined the New American Movement. In 2010, he would write a lengthy essay titled, "The New American Movement and Why It Failed" for the journal Work and Days.

In 2005 Aronowitz co-founded the journal Situations: Project of the Radical Imagination. He has also published articles in numerous publications and with a core group of intellectuals—faculty and students—at the Graduate Center, he spearheaded the effort to create the Center for Cultural Studies (now the Center for the Study of Culture, Technology and Work) in the spirit of fostering intellectual debate, multidisciplinarity, and the toppling of high cultural privilege in academia. In 1969, Aronowitz, Jeremy Brecher, Paul Mattick Jr., and Peter Rachleff, began sporadically publishing a magazine and pamphlet series called Root & Branch.

Family
Aronowitz lived in New York City. He was first married to Jane O'Connell until divorcing in 1962 and was then married to Ellen Willis from 1998 until her death in November 2006. He had five children, including Nona Willis-Aronowitz.

Works

Aronowitz has authored, co-authored, or edited over 26 different books, as well as authored over 200 articles and reviews.

Bibliography

Coauthored works

References

External links 
 

1933 births
2021 deaths
Jewish American writers
American political writers
American male non-fiction writers
American sociologists
New York (state) Greens
Graduate Center, CUNY faculty
Labor historians
Duke University faculty
American Marxists
American anti–nuclear power activists
American democracy activists
American environmentalists
Consumer rights activists
Jewish activists
Jewish socialists
The High School of Music & Art alumni
CUNY School of Labor and Urban Studies faculty
New American Movement
Columbia University faculty